The Banu Mudlej were a tribe from around the time of the Islamic prophet Muhammad. They were involved in a conflict with him during the Invasion of Dul Ashir and resided around al-Usharayh area of Saudi Arabia.

See also
List of expeditions of Muhammad

References

Arabian tribes that interacted with Muhammad